Mixed Complementarity Problem (MCP) is a problem formulation in mathematical programming. Many well-known problem types are special cases of, or may be reduced to MCP. It is a generalization of nonlinear complementarity problem (NCP).

Definition 
The mixed complementarity problem is defined by a mapping , lower values  and upper values .

The solution of the MCP is a vector  such that for each index  one of the following alternatives holds:

 ;
 ;
 .

Another definition for MCP is: it is a variational inequality on the parallelepiped .

See also 
 Complementarity theory

References 
 
 

Mathematical optimization